Thomas Harland (born 15 January 1942) is a former English cricketer.  Harland was a left-handed batsman who fielded as a wicket-keeper.  He was born in Hetton-le-Hole, County Durham.

Harland made his debut for Durham against Staffordshire in the 1974 Minor Counties Championship.  He played Minor counties cricket for Durham from 1974 to 1979, making 30 Minor Counties Championship appearances.  He made his List A debut against Hertfordshire in the 1974 Gillette Cup.  He made 3 further List A appearances, the last of which came against Yorkshire in the 1978 Gillette Cup.  In his 4 List A matches, he scored 26 runs at an average of 8.66, with a high score of 16.  Behind the stumps he took 5 catches.

References

External links
Tommy Harland at ESPNcricinfo
Tommy Harland at CricketArchive

1942 births
Living people
People from Hetton-le-Hole
Footballers from Tyne and Wear
English cricketers
Durham cricketers
Wicket-keepers